High Spen is an old mining village in the Metropolitan Borough of Gateshead, historically  part of County Durham. There is an entrance to Chopwell Wood, whose Christmas Trees  sales attract many visitors to the village every year. High Spen has one pub, called The Bute Arms, and one Working Men's Club. There is also a micro pub called Wigs. There is also a primary school, called High Spen Primary School. High Spen also is home to St Patrick's C of E Church.

Transport
High Spen used to have a bus depot (located off Strothers Road) that was home to the Venture Bus Company. Venture used to run services around Derwent Valley, mainly between Shotley Bridge and Newcastle. Venture, and the bus depot at High Spen, eventually passed into the hands of Northern General Transport Company, where it stayed operational until the late 1980s when it was eventually closed down.

Notable people
During the First World War, two soldiers from High Spen were awarded the Victoria Cross: Lance Corporal Frederick William Dobson of the Coldstream Guards, and Private Thomas Young of the Durham Light Infantry. Other members of the village during World War Two were taken as Prisoner of War during the events of Saint-Valery-en-Caux where they were originally used to keep German soldiers back from Dunkirk to evacuate other members of the British forces.

Category D village
High Spen was categorised as a "Category D village" by Durham County Council, one of many scheduled for destruction and demolition following the decline of mining in the west of the county in the 1950s and 1960s.

Later development
The D-village policy was cancelled in 1977, since when the village has gradually grown and developed, serving as a commuter village accessible to the centres of Newcastle upon Tyne, Gateshead and Durham City.

Education 
High Spen used to have a coeducational comprehensive school, Hookergate School, located in the village. The school was closed down in 2011 and pupils from the village moved to neighbouring villages for their secondary education. Most pupils in High Spen attend Thorp Academy in Ryton.

References

External links 

HIGH SPEN A HUNDRED YEARS
 High Spen Traditional Rapper Sword Dancers

Villages in Tyne and Wear